Teitelbaum (teytlboym, deriving from a Yiddish/Germanic word meaning "date palm [tree]") is a Jewish surname. Variants include Tetelbaum, Teitelboim

Notable people with the surname include:

 Aaron Teitelbaum (b. 1948), Satmar rebbe
 Alfred Tarski (1901-1983), born Alfred Teitelbaum, Polish-American mathematician
 Benjamin R. Teitelbaum, American ethnomusicologist
 Chananya Yom Tov Lipa Teitelbaum, Sigheter rebbe
 Chaim Tzvi Teitelbaum (1880–1926), Sigheter rebbe, author of Atzei Chaim
 Joel Teitelbaum (1887–1979), founder of the Satmar Hasidic dynasty
 Jonn Teitelbaum, founder of American restaurant chain Johnny Rockets
 Mashel Teitelbaum (1921–1985), Canadian painter
 Matthew Teitelbaum, Canadian art historian
 Michael Teitelbaum, American demographer
 Moshe Teitelbaum (Ujhel) (1759–1841), rabbi known as the Yismach Moshe
 Moshe Teitelbaum (Satmar) (1914–2006), world leader of Satmar Hasidic Judaism
 Richard Teitelbaum (1939–2020), composer and keyboardist
 Ruth Teitelbaum  (1924–1986), American computer programmer and mathematician
 Yekusiel Yehuda Teitelbaum (I) (1808–1883), Hasidic rebbe in Austria-Hungary
 Yekusiel Yehuda Teitelbaum (II) (1911–1944), Hasidic rebbe in Romania and Hungary
 Zalman Teitelbaum (b. 1952), Satmar rebbe

See also

Jewish surnames
Yiddish-language surnames